This is a list of the longest-running shows (3,000 performances or more) in the West End, a well known professional theatre district in London. Nine currently running shows (two plays, seven musicals) have more than 3,000 performances: The Mousetrap, Les Misérables, The Phantom Of The Opera, The Woman in Black, Mamma Mia!, The Lion King, Wicked, Matilda, and The Book of Mormon.

List
Unless otherwise stated, the number of performances listed is for the original West End production of the show.  M denotes a musical, P denotes a straight play, R denotes a revue, D denotes a dance musical, and S denotes a special case.  An asterisk indicates an announced closing date for a currently-running show. All shows that are currently running are bolded.

See also
Long-running musical theatre productions
List of the longest-running Broadway shows

Notes

References

.
.
List of longest-running
Longest-running West End shows